Pop Life is the debut album of New Zealand band, Breathe released in 1998.

Track listing
Smiley Hands
Drivin'''BurstGet To YouFallPurpleGoing DownNot NowStarted SomethingBurnt By The SunPet Tortoise''

1998 debut albums
Breathe (New Zealand band) albums